Zoltan Vajo is a Hungarian/American scientist, best known  for his contributions to the Human Genome Project, including cloning the COQ7 gene, characterizing the human CLK-1 timing protein cDNA  and its potential effect on aging, and research on the molecular and genetic background of skeletal dysplasias and fibroblast growth factor receptor 3 disorders, including Achondroplasia, SADDAN (severe achondroplasia with developmental delay and acanthosis nigricans), Thanatophoric dysplasia, Muenke coronal craniosynostosis and Crouzon syndrome as well as more recently on genetically engineered insulin analog molecules, including their structure, metabolic effects and cellular processing  and the role of recombinant DNA technology in the treatment of diabetes.

Contributions
Vajo et al. in 1999 cloned COQ7  from human heart. They found that the predicted protein contains 179 amino acids, is mostly helical, and contains an alpha-helical membrane insertion. It has a potential N-glycosylation site, a phosphorylation site for protein kinase C and another for casein kinase II, and 3 N-myristoylation sites. Northern blot analysis detected 3 transcripts; a 1-kb transcript was predominant in heart, and a 3-kb transcript was predominant in skeletal muscle, kidney, and pancreas.

Vajo et al. found in 2000 that alterations in venous reactivity to alpha- and beta-adrenergic, nitric oxide (NO)-dependent, and other drugs are present in many genetically determined and acquired conditions, such as hypertension, smoking, and aging.

In 2001, Fawcett, Bennett, Hamel, Vajo and Duckworth showed that the effect of human insulin and its analogues on protein degradation vary significantly in different cell types and with different experimental conditions. The differences seen in the action of the insulin analogues cannot be attributed to binding differences only. Post-receptor mechanisms, including intracellular processing and degradation, must be also considered. Since then, recombinant DNA technology and the use of insulin analogues has become a major part of the treatment of diabetes.

More recently (2007-2019), Vajo et al. developed novel influenza vaccines based on reverse genetics technology, including vaccines against the H5N1 bird flu and the H1N1 swine flu viruses, as well as seasonal influenza.  In preparation for the influenza pandemic, Vajo and Jankovics showed that instead of the conventionally used split virion or subunit vaccines, lower doses of whole virus vaccines are able to induce sufficient immune responses even against newly emerged influenza virus strains in pediatric  adult  and elderly patients, without increasing the rate of adverse events. This was achieved in part by using aluminum phosphate as an adjuvant. These vaccines were used to combat the 2009 swine flu pandemic. The technologies developed during the preparation for an influenza pandemic were successfully translated into the production of reduced dose, seasonal trivalent influenza vaccines, which since have been licensed for clinical use.

Important publications

 
,

In the media
 On CNN, July 29, 2007

 The Doctors' Channel, December 23, 2008

The Daily Miner, April 16, 2010: KRMC doctor on Swiss flu vaccine safety board

The Daily Miner, July 12, 2010

References

American geneticists
Living people
Year of birth missing (living people)